William Thompson Wallace (March 22, 1828 – August 11, 1909) was the 12th Chief Justice of California and the 6th Attorney General of California. He served on the Supreme Court of California from 1871 to 1879 and as Attorney General from 1856 to 1858.

Biography
Wallace was born on March 22, 1828 in Mount Sterling, Kentucky. His father, Joseph, was a physician, who by 1850 was widowed with six children living in Montgomery County, Kentucky. Wallace was educated and read law, followed his older brother onto the Kentucky bar and practiced law.

In 1850, at age 22, he moved to San Jose, California. He began a law firm with C. T. Ryland, and was joined after January 1851 by Peter H. Burnett, after he completed his term as the first Governor of California. In 1852, Wallace won appointment as District Attorney for four counties, based in San Jose. After one year, he resigned and began a private practice.

In September 1855, he ran successfully for Attorney General of California for the Know Nothing party, on the same ticket as David S. Terry, who was elected to the California Supreme Court. He served in that office from January 1856 to January 1858.

After leaving office, in 1861 Wallace joined the law firm  of Patterson & Stow, formed in 1857 by William H. Patterson and W. W. Stow in San Francisco, and practiced there for seven years.

In October 1869, Wallace ran against Lorenzo Sawyer and was elected as an associate justice of the California Supreme Court. Wallace won a ten year term beginning January 10, 1870, and ending January 1, 1880. After the February 24, 1872, death of Royal Sprague, from March 1872 to December 1879 Wallace was the chief justice. In 1873, Wallace's name was put forward as a candidate of the Democratic Party for U.S. Senator, and even as a possible candidate for Vice President of the United States.

In August 1880, Wallace again was again put forward as a Democratic Party candidate for U.S. Senate. On January 12, 1881, the California State Assembly chose Republican General John F. Miller of Napa to replace Newton Booth as U.S. Senator by a vote of 42 for Miller and 34 for Wallace.

After stepping down from the high court, Wallace continued to hold public office. In 1882, Wallace was nominated by the Democratic Party and elected Assemblyman from the 13th district, holding a seat in the California State Assembly from January through March, 1883. In October 1886, Wallace was elected as a judge of the San Francisco County Superior Court, Department Six, for a six-year term. In October 1892, he successfully ran for re-election for a term through December 31, 1898. In 1899, Wallace was appointed to the San Francisco Police Commission by Mayor James D. Phelan, and held that position until 1903.

Wallace died on August 11, 1909, in San Francisco, California.

Civic activities
In October 1875, Governor Romualdo Pacheco appointed Wallace a regent of the University of California.

Wallace was a member of the Bohemian Club.

Personal life
On March 30, 1853, he married Romietta Juet Burnett, the daughter of his law partner and first Governor of California under American rule, Peter Burnett. They had three sons: William T. Wallace, Jr., who died in 1899; Richard R. Wallace; and Ryland B. Wallace, who became an attorney and in May 1895 was appointed as a code commissioner by Governor James Budd. They also had four daughters: Mary A. and Margaret, and Romie and Isabelle ("Belle") Wallace. On January 25, 1884, Belle first married Colonel J. Mervyn Donohue. After his death on March 3, 1890, she married R. H. Sprague on October 11, 1894, at her father's home.

References

Selected publications
 Wallace, William T. (1857). In memoriam to Hugh Murray, 8 Cal. Rpt. iii. California Supreme Court Historical Society.

External links
William T. Wallace biography with picture. State of California Department of Justice.
 William T. Wallace. California Supreme Court Historical Society.
 Past & Present Justices. California State Courts. Retrieved July 19, 2017.

See also
 List of justices of the Supreme Court of California
 Joseph B. Crockett
 Royal Sprague
 Jackson Temple
 Addison Niles
 Isaac S. Belcher
 Elisha W. McKinstry

1828 births
1909 deaths
California Attorneys General
California Know Nothings
19th-century American politicians
Democratic Party members of the California State Assembly
Chief Justices of California
U.S. state supreme court judges admitted to the practice of law by reading law
Justices of the Supreme Court of California
19th-century American judges
California state court judges
Superior court judges in the United States
People from Mount Sterling, Kentucky
Politicians from San Francisco
Lawyers from San Francisco
University of California regents